

Events

Pre-1600
 838 – Battle of Anzen: The Byzantine emperor Theophilos suffers a heavy defeat by the Abbasids.
1099 – First Crusade: Godfrey of Bouillon is elected the first Defender of the Holy Sepulchre of The Kingdom of Jerusalem.
1209 – Massacre at Béziers: The first major military action of the Albigensian Crusade.
1298 – Wars of Scottish Independence: Battle of Falkirk: King Edward I of England and his longbowmen defeat William Wallace and his Scottish schiltrons outside the town of Falkirk.
1342 – St. Mary Magdalene's flood is the worst such event on record for central Europe.
1443 – Battle of St. Jakob an der Sihl in the Old Zürich War. 
1456 – Ottoman wars in Europe: Siege of Belgrade: John Hunyadi, Regent of the Kingdom of Hungary, defeats Mehmet II of the Ottoman Empire.
1484 – Battle of Lochmaben Fair: A 500-man raiding party led by Alexander Stewart, Duke of Albany and James Douglas, 9th Earl of Douglas are defeated by Scots forces loyal to Albany's brother James III of Scotland; Douglas is captured.
1499 – Battle of Dornach: The Swiss decisively defeat the army of Maximilian I, Holy Roman Emperor.
1587 – Roanoke Colony: A second group of English settlers arrives on Roanoke Island off North Carolina to re-establish the deserted colony.
1594 – The Dutch city of Groningen defended by the Spanish and besieged by a Dutch and English army under Maurice of Orange, capitulates.
1598 – William Shakespeare's play, The Merchant of Venice, is entered on the Stationers' Register. By decree of Queen Elizabeth, the Stationers' Register licensed printed works, giving the Crown tight control over all published material.

1601–1900
1686 – Albany, New York is formally chartered as a municipality by Governor Thomas Dongan.
1706 – The Acts of Union 1707 are agreed upon by commissioners from the Kingdom of England and the Kingdom of Scotland, which, when passed by each country's Parliament, led to the creation of the Kingdom of Great Britain.
1793 – Alexander Mackenzie reaches the Pacific Ocean becoming the first recorded human to complete a transcontinental crossing of North America.
1796 – Surveyors of the Connecticut Land Company name an area in Ohio "Cleveland" after Gen. Moses Cleaveland, the superintendent of the surveying party.
1797 – Battle of Santa Cruz de Tenerife: Battle between Spanish and British naval forces during the French Revolutionary Wars. During the Battle, Rear-Admiral Nelson is wounded in the arm and the arm had to be partially amputated.
1802 – Emperor Gia Long conquers Hanoi and unified Viet Nam, which had experienced centuries of feudal warfare.
1805 – Napoleonic Wars: War of the Third Coalition: Battle of Cape Finisterre: An inconclusive naval action is fought between a combined French and Spanish fleet under Admiral Pierre-Charles Villeneuve of France and a British fleet under Admiral Robert Calder.
1812 – Napoleonic Wars: Peninsular War: Battle of Salamanca: British forces led by Arthur Wellesley (later the Duke of Wellington) defeat French troops near Salamanca, Spain.
1833 – The Slavery Abolition Act passes in the British House of Commons, initiating the gradual abolition of slavery in most parts of the British Empire.
1864 – American Civil War: Battle of Atlanta: Outside Atlanta, Confederate General John Bell Hood leads an unsuccessful attack on Union troops under General William T. Sherman on Bald Hill.
1893 – Katharine Lee Bates writes "America the Beautiful" after admiring the view from the top of Pikes Peak near Colorado Springs, Colorado.
1894 – The first ever motor race is held in France between the cities of Paris and Rouen. The fastest finisher was the Comte Jules-Albert de Dion, but the "official" victory was awarded to Albert Lemaître driving his three-horsepower petrol engined Peugeot.

1901–present
1916 – Preparedness Day Bombing: In San Francisco, a bomb explodes on Market Street during a parade, killing ten and injuring 40.
1921 – Rif War: The Spanish Army suffers its worst military defeat in modern times to the Berbers of the Rif region of Spanish Morocco.
1933 – Aviator Wiley Post returns to Floyd Bennett Field in New York City, completing the first solo flight around the world in seven days, 18 hours and 49 minutes.
1936 – Spanish Civil War: The Popular Executive Committee of Valencia takes power in the Valencian Community.
1937 – New Deal: The United States Senate votes down President Franklin D. Roosevelt's proposal to add more justices to the Supreme Court of the United States.
1942 – The United States government begins compulsory civilian gasoline rationing due to the wartime demands.
  1942   – Grossaktion Warsaw: The systematic deportation of Jews from the Warsaw ghetto begins.
1943 – World War II: Allied forces capture Palermo during the Allied invasion of Sicily.
  1943   – World War II: Axis occupation forces violently disperse a massive protest in Athens, killing 22.
1944 – The Polish Committee of National Liberation publishes its manifesto, starting the period of Communist rule in Poland.
1946 – King David Hotel bombing: A Zionist underground organisation, the Irgun, bombs the King David Hotel in Jerusalem, site of the civil administration and military headquarters for Mandatory Palestine, resulting in 91 deaths.
1962 – Mariner program: Mariner 1 spacecraft flies erratically several minutes after launch and has to be destroyed.
1963 – Crown Colony of Sarawak gains self-governance.
1973 – Pan Am Flight 816 crashes after takeoff from Faa'a International Airport in Papeete, French Polynesia, killing 78.
1976 – Japan completes its last reparation to the Philippines for war crimes committed during imperial Japan's conquest of the country in the Second World War.
1977 – Chinese leader Deng Xiaoping is restored to power.
1983 – Martial law in Poland is officially revoked.
1990 – Greg LeMond, an American road racing cyclist, wins his third Tour de France after leading the majority of the race. It was LeMond's second consecutive Tour de France victory.
1992 – Near Medellín, Colombian drug lord Pablo Escobar escapes from his luxury prison fearing extradition to the United States.
1993 – Great Flood of 1993: Levees near Kaskaskia, Illinois rupture, forcing the entire town to evacuate by barges operated by the Army Corps of Engineers.
1997 – The second Blue Water Bridge opens between Port Huron, Michigan and Sarnia, Ontario.
2003 – Members of 101st Airborne of the United States, aided by Special Forces, attack a compound in Iraq, killing Saddam Hussein's sons Uday and Qusay, along with Mustapha Hussein, Qusay's 14-year-old son, and a bodyguard.
2005 – Jean Charles de Menezes is killed by police as the hunt begins for the London Bombers responsible for the 7 July 2005 London bombings and the 21 July 2005 London bombings.
2011 – Norway attacks: First a bomb blast which targeted government buildings in central Oslo, followed by a massacre at a youth camp on the island of Utøya.
2012 – Syrian civil war: The People's Protection Units (YPG) captured the cities of Serê Kaniyê and Dirbêsiyê, during clashes with pro-government forces in Al-Hasakah.
2013 – Dingxi earthquakes: A series of earthquakes in Dingxi, China, kills at least 89 people and injures more than 500 others.
2019 – Chandrayaan 2, the second lunar exploration mission developed by Indian Space Research Organisation after Chandrayaan 1 is launched from Satish Dhawan Space Centre in a GSLV Mark III M1. It consists of a lunar orbiter, and also included the Vikram lander, and the Pragyan lunar rover.

Births

Pre-1600
1210 – Joan of England, Queen of Scotland (d. 1238)
1437 – John Scrope, 5th Baron Scrope of Bolton, English Baron (d. 1498)
1476 – Zhu Youyuan, Ming Dynasty politician (d. 1519)
1478 – Philip I of Castile (d. 1506)
1531 – Leonhard Thurneysser, scholar at the court of the Elector of Brandenburg (d. 1595)
1535 – Katarina Stenbock, queen of Gustav I of Sweden (d. 1621)
1552 – Anthony Browne, Sheriff of Surrey and Kent (d. 1592)
  1552   – Mary Wriothesley, Countess of Southampton, Lady of English peer and others (d. 1607)
1559 – Lawrence of Brindisi, Italian priest and saint (d. 1619)

1601–1900
1615 – Marguerite of Lorraine, princess of Lorraine, duchess of Orléans (d. 1672)
1618 – Johan Nieuhof, Dutch traveler (d. 1672)
1621 – Anthony Ashley Cooper, 1st Earl of Shaftesbury, English politician, Lord Chancellor of the United Kingdom (d. 1683)
1630 – Madame de Brinvilliers, French aristocrat (d. 1676)
1647 – Margaret Mary Alacoque, French nun, mystic and saint (d. 1690)
1651 – Ferdinand Tobias Richter, Austrian organist and composer (d. 1711)
1711 – Georg Wilhelm Richmann, German-Russian physicist and academic (d. 1753)
1713 – Jacques-Germain Soufflot, French architect, designed the Panthéon (d. 1780)
1733 – Mikhail Shcherbatov, Russian philosopher and historian (d. 1790)
1755 – Gaspard de Prony, French mathematician and engineer (d. 1839)
1784 – Friedrich Bessel, German mathematician and astronomer (d. 1846)
1820 – Oliver Mowat, Canadian politician, 3rd Premier of Ontario, 8th Lieutenant Governor of Ontario (d. 1903)
1839 – Jakob Hurt, Estonian theologist and linguist (d. 1907)
1844 – William Archibald Spooner, English priest and scholar (d. 1930)
1848 – Adolphus Frederick V, Grand Duke of Mecklenburg-Strelitz (d. 1914)
1849 – Emma Lazarus, American poet and educator (d. 1887)
1856 – Octave Hamelin, French philosopher (d. 1907)
1862 – Cosmo Duff-Gordon, Scottish fencer (d. 1931)
1863 – Alec Hearne, English cricketer (d. 1952)
1878 – Janusz Korczak, Polish pediatrician and author (d. 1942)
1881 – Augusta Fox Bronner, American psychologist, specialist in juvenile psychology (d. 1966)
1882 – Edward Hopper, American painter and etcher (d. 1967)
1884 – Odell Shepard, American poet and politician, 66th Lieutenant Governor of Connecticut (d. 1967)
1886 – Hella Wuolijoki, Estonian-Finnish author (d. 1954)
1887 – Gustav Ludwig Hertz, German physicist and academic, Nobel Prize laureate (d. 1975)
1888 – Kirk Bryan, American geologist and academic (d. 1950)
  1888   – Selman Waksman, Jewish-American biochemist and microbiologist, Nobel Prize laureate (d. 1973)
1889 – James Whale, English director (d. 1957)
1890 – Rose Kennedy, American philanthropist (d. 1995)
1892 – Jack MacBryan, English cricketer and field hockey player (d. 1983)
1893 – Jesse Haines, American baseball player and coach (d. 1978)
  1893   – Karl Menninger, American psychiatrist and author (d. 1990)
1895 – León de Greiff, Colombian poet, journalist, and diplomat (d. 1976)
1898 – Stephen Vincent Benét, American poet, short story writer, and novelist (d. 1943)
1899 – Sobhuza II of Swaziland (d. 1982)

1901–present
1908 – Amy Vanderbilt, American author (d. 1974)
1909 – Licia Albanese, Italian-American soprano and actress (d. 2014)
  1909   – Dorino Serafini, Italian racing driver (d. 2000)
1910 – Ruthie Tompson, American animator and artist (d. 2021)
1913 – Gorni Kramer, Italian bassist, songwriter, and bandleader (d. 1995)
1915 – Shaista Suhrawardy Ikramullah, Indian-Pakistani politician and diplomat (d. 2000)
1916 – Gino Bianco, Brazilian racing driver (d. 1984)
  1916   – Marcel Cerdan, French boxer (d. 1949)
1921 – William Roth, American lawyer and politician (d. 2003)
1923 – Bob Dole, American soldier, lawyer, and politician (d. 2021)
  1923   – César Fernández Ardavín, Spanish director, producer, and screenwriter (d. 2012)
1924 – Margaret Whiting, American singer (d. 2011)
1925 – Jack Matthews, American author, playwright, and academic (d. 2013)
  1925   – Joseph Sargent, American actor, director, and producer (d. 2014)
1926 – Bryan Forbes, English actor, director, producer, and screenwriter (d. 2013)
  1926   – Wolfgang Iser, German scholar, literary theorist (d. 2007)
1927 – Johan Ferner, Norwegian sailor (d. 2015)
1928 – Orson Bean, American actor (d. 2020)
  1928   – Jimmy Hill, English footballer, manager, and sportscaster (d. 2015)
  1928   – Per Højholt, Danish poet (d. 2004)
1929 – John Barber, English racing driver (d. 2015)
  1929   – Leonid Stolovich, Russian-Estonian philosopher and academic (d. 2013)
  1929   – Neil Welliver, American painter (d. 2005)
  1929   – Baselios Thomas I, Indian bishop
1931 – Leo Labine, Canadian ice hockey player (d. 2005)
1932 – Oscar de la Renta, Dominican-American fashion designer (d. 2014)
  1932   – Tom Robbins, American novelist
1934 – Junior Cook, American saxophonist (d. 1992)  
  1934   – Louise Fletcher, American actress (d. 2022)
  1934   – Leon Rotman, Romanian canoeist
1935 – Tom Cartwright, English-Welsh cricketer and coach (d. 2007)
1936 – Don Patterson, American organist (d. 1988) 
  1936   – Harold Rhodes, English cricketer
  1936   – Geraldine Claudette Darden, American mathematician
1937 – Chuck Jackson, American R&B singer and songwriter
  1937   – Yasuhiro Kojima, Japanese-American wrestler and manager (d. 1999)
  1937   – John Price, English cricketer
  1937   – Vasant Ranjane, Indian cricketer (d. 2011)
1938 – Terence Stamp, English actor
1940 – Judith Walzer Leavitt, American historian and academic
  1940   – Alex Trebek, Canadian-American game show host and producer (d. 2020)
1941 – Estelle Bennett, American singer (d. 2009)
  1941   – Vaughn Bodē, American illustrator (d. 1975)
  1941   – George Clinton, American singer-songwriter and producer
  1941   – David M. Kennedy, American historian and author
1942 – Michael Abney-Hastings, 14th Earl of Loudoun, English-Australian politician (d. 2012)
  1942   – Peter Habeler, Austrian mountaineer and skier
  1942   – Les Johns, Australian rugby league player and coach
1943 – Masaru Emoto, Japanese author and activist (d. 2014)
  1943   – Kay Bailey Hutchison, American lawyer and politician
  1943   – Bobby Sherman, American singer-songwriter and actor
1944 – Rick Davies, English singer-songwriter and keyboard player 
  1944   – Sparky Lyle, American baseball player and manager
  1944   – Anand Satyanand, New Zealand lawyer, judge, and politician, 19th Governor-General of New Zealand
1945 – Philip Cohen, English biochemist and academic
1946 – Danny Glover, American actor, director, and producer
  1946   – Paul Schrader, American director and screenwriter
  1946   – Rolando Joven Tria Tirona, Filipino archbishop
  1946   – Johnson Toribiong, Palauan lawyer and politician, 7th President of Palau
1947 – Albert Brooks, American actor, comedian, director, and screenwriter
  1947   – Gilles Duceppe, Canadian politician
  1947   – Don Henley, American singer-songwriter and drummer
1948 – Neil Hardwick, British–Finnish theatre and television director
  1948   – S. E. Hinton, American author 
1949 – Alan Menken, American pianist and composer
  1949   – Lasse Virén, Finnish runner and police officer
1951 – Richard Bennett, American guitarist and producer 
  1951   – J. V. Cain, American football player (d. 1979)
  1951   – Patriarch Daniel of Romania
1953 – Brian Howe, English singer-songwriter 
1954 – Al Di Meola, American guitarist, songwriter, and producer 
  1954   – Steve LaTourette, American lawyer and politician (d. 2016)
  1954   – Lonette McKee, American actress and singer
  1954   – Ingrid Daubechies, Belgian physicist and mathematician
1955 – Richard J. Corman, American businessman, founded the R.J. Corman Railroad Group (d. 2013)
  1955   – Willem Dafoe, American actor
1956 – Mick Pointer, English neo-progressive rock drummer
  1956   – Scott Sanderson, American baseball player and sportscaster (d. 2019)
1957 – Dave Stieb, American baseball player
1958 – Tatsunori Hara, Japanese baseball player and coach
  1958   – David Von Erich, American wrestler (d. 1984)
1960 – Jon Oliva, American singer-songwriter and keyboard player 
  1960   – John Leguizamo, Colombian-American actor, producer, and screenwriter
1961 – Calvin Fish, English racing driver and sportscaster
  1961   – Keith Sweat, American singer-songwriter and producer 
1962 – Alvin Robertson, American basketball player
  1962   – Martine St. Clair, Canadian singer and actress
1963 – Emilio Butragueño, Spanish footballer
  1963   – Emily Saliers, American singer-songwriter and musician 
1964 – Will Calhoun, American rock drummer
  1964   – Bonnie Langford, English actress and dancer
  1964   – David Spade, American actor, producer, and screenwriter
1965 – Derrick Dalley, Canadian educator and politician
  1965   – Shawn Michaels, American wrestler, trainer, and actor
  1965   – Richard B. Poore, New Zealand humanitarian
  1965   – Doug Riesenberg, American football player and coach
1966 – Tim Brown, American football player and manager
1967 – Lauren Booth, English journalist and activist
  1967   – Rhys Ifans, Welsh actor 
1969 – Rebecca Kiessling, American attorney and anti-abortion activist
  1969   – Despina Vandi, German-Greek singer and actress
1970 – Jason Becker, American guitarist and songwriter 
  1970   – Steve Carter, Australian rugby league player 
  1970   – Sergei Zubov, Russian ice hockey player and coach
1972 – Franco Battaini, Italian motorcycle racer
  1972   – Colin Ferguson, Canadian actor, director, and producer
  1972   – Seth Fisher, American illustrator (d. 2006)
  1972   – Keyshawn Johnson, American football player and sportscaster
1973 – Brian Chippendale, American singer and drummer 
  1973   – Mike Sweeney, American baseball player and sportscaster
  1973   – Ece Temelkuran, Turkish journalist and author
  1973   – Rufus Wainwright, American-Canadian singer-songwriter
1974 – Franka Potente, German actress 
1977 – Ezio Galon, Italian rugby player
  1977   – Ingo Hertzsch, German footballer
  1977   – Gustavo Nery, Brazilian footballer
1978 – Runako Morton, Nevisian cricketer (d. 2012)
  1978   – Dennis Rommedahl, Danish footballer
1979 – Lucas Luhr, German racing driver
  1979   – Yadel Martí, Cuban baseball player
1980 – Dirk Kuyt, Dutch footballer
  1980   – Scott Dixon, New Zealand racing driver 
  1980   – Kate Ryan, Belgian singer-songwriter
  1980   – Tablo, South Korean-Canadian rapper
1982 – Nuwan Kulasekara, Sri Lankan cricketer
1983 – Aldo de Nigris, Mexican footballer
  1983   – Dries Devenyns, Belgian cyclist
  1983   – Steven Jackson, American football player
  1983   – Andreas Ulvo, Norwegian pianist 
1984 – Stewart Downing, English footballer
1985 – Jessica Abbott, Australian swimmer
  1985   – Takudzwa Ngwenya, Zimbabwean-American rugby player
  1985   – Akira Tozawa, Japanese wrestler
1986 – Stevie Johnson, American football player
  1986   – Colin de Grandhomme, Zimbabwean-New Zealand cricketer
1987 – Denis Gargaud Chanut, French slalom canoeist
  1987   – Charlotte Kalla, Swedish skier
1988 – William Buick, Norwegian-British flat jockey
  1988   – Paul Coutts, Scottish footballer
  1988   – Thomas Kraft, German footballer
  1988   – George Santos, American politician
  1988   – Sercan Temizyürek, Turkish footballer
1989 – Keegan Allen, American actor, photographer and musician
1991 – Matty James, English footballer
1991 – Tomi Juric, Australian footballer
1992 – Anja Aguilar, Filipino actress and singer
  1992   – Selena Gomez, American singer and actress
  1992   – Carolin Schnarre, German Paralympic equestrian
1993 – Dzhokhar Tsarnaev, Kyrgyzstani-American terrorist
1994 – Jaz Sinclair, American film and television actress
1995 – Ezekiel Elliott, American football player
  1995   – Armaan Malik, Indian playback singer, composer and songwriter
1996 – Skyler Gisondo, American actor
1998 – Sahaphap Wongratch, Thai actor, model, and singer
1999 – Sidney Chu, Hong Kong skater
2002 – Prince Felix of Denmark
2013 – Prince George of Wales

Deaths

Pre-1600
 698 – Wu Chengsi, nephew of Chinese sovereign Wu Zetian
1258 – Meinhard I, Count of Gorizia-Tyrol (b. c. 1200)
1274 – Henry I of Navarre, Count of Champagne and Brie and King of Navarre
1298 – Sir John de Graham, Scottish soldier at the Battle of Falkirk
1362 – Louis, Count of Gravina (b. 1324)
1376 – Simon Langham, Archbishop of Canterbury (b. 1310)
1387 – Frans Ackerman, Flemish politician (b. 1330)
1461 – Charles VII of France (b. 1403)
1525 – Richard Wingfield, English courtier and diplomat, Chancellor of the Duchy of Lancaster (b. 1426)
1540 – John Zápolya, Hungarian king (b. 1487)
1550 – Jorge de Lencastre, Duke of Coimbra (b. 1481)
1581 – Richard Cox, English bishop (b. 1500)

1601–1900
1619 – Lawrence of Brindisi, Italian priest and saint (b. 1559)
1645 – Gaspar de Guzmán, Count-Duke of Olivares, Spanish statesman (b. 1587)
1676 – Pope Clement X (b. 1590)
1726 – Hugh Drysdale, English-American politician, Colonial Governor of Virginia
1734 – Peter King, 1st Baron King, English lawyer and politician, Lord Chancellor of England (b. 1669)
1789 – Joseph Foullon de Doué, French politician, Controller-General of Finances (b. 1715)
1802 – Marie François Xavier Bichat, French anatomist and physiologist (b. 1771)
1824 – Thomas Macnamara Russell, English admiral
1826 – Giuseppe Piazzi, Italian mathematician and astronomer (b. 1746)
1832 – Napoleon II, French emperor (b. 1811)
1833 – Joseph Forlenze, Italian ophthalmologist and surgeon (b. 1757)
1864 – James B. McPherson, American general (b. 1828)
1869 – John A. Roebling, German-American engineer, designed the Brooklyn Bridge (b. 1806)

1901–present
1902 – Mieczysław Halka-Ledóchowski, Polish cardinal (b. 1822)
1903 – Cassius Marcellus Clay, American publisher, lawyer, and politician, United States Ambassador to Russia (b. 1810)
1904 – Wilson Barrett, English actor and playwright (b. 1846)
1906 – William Snodgrass, Canadian minister and academic (b. 1827)
1908 – Randal Cremer, English politician, Nobel Prize laureate (b. 1828)
1915 – Sandford Fleming, Scottish-Canadian engineer and inventor, developed Standard time (b. 1827)
1916 – James Whitcomb Riley, American poet and author (b. 1849)
1918 – Indra Lal Roy, Indian lieutenant and first Indian fighter aircraft pilot (b. 1898)
1920 – William Kissam Vanderbilt, American businessman and horse breeder (b. 1849)
1922 – Jōkichi Takamine, Japanese-American chemist and academic (b. 1854)
1932 – J. Meade Falkner, English author and poet (b. 1858)
  1932   – Reginald Fessenden, Canadian inventor and academic (b. 1866)
  1932   – Errico Malatesta, Italian activist and author (b. 1853)
  1932   – Flo Ziegfeld, American actor and producer (b. 1867)
1934 – John Dillinger, American gangster (b. 1903)
1937 – Ted McDonald, Australian cricketer and footballer (b. 1891)
1940 – George Fuller, Australian politician, 22nd Premier of New South Wales (b. 1861)
  1940   – Albert Young, American boxer and promoter (b. 1877)
1948 – Rūdolfs Jurciņš, Latvian basketball player (b. 1909) 
1950 – William Lyon Mackenzie King, Canadian economist and politician, 10th Prime Minister of Canada (b. 1874)
1958 – Mikhail Zoshchenko, Ukrainian-Russian soldier and author (b. 1895)
1967 – Carl Sandburg, American poet and historian (b. 1878)
1968 – Giovannino Guareschi, Italian journalist and cartoonist (b. 1908)
1970 – George Johnston, Australian journalist and author (b. 1912)
1974 – Wayne Morse, American lawyer and politician (b. 1900)
1979 – J. V. Cain, American football player (b. 1951)
  1979   – Sándor Kocsis, Hungarian footballer and manager (b. 1929)
1986 – Floyd Gottfredson, American author and illustrator (b. 1905)
  1986   – Ede Staal, Dutch singer-songwriter (b. 1941)
1987 – Fahrettin Kerim Gökay, Turkish physician and politician, Turkish Minister of Health (b. 1900)
1990 – Manuel Puig, Argentinian author, playwright, and screenwriter (b. 1932)
  1990   – Eduard Streltsov, Soviet footballer (b. 1937)
1992 – David Wojnarowicz, American painter, photographer, and activist (b. 1954)
1995 – Harold Larwood, English-Australian cricketer (b. 1904)
1996 – Rob Collins, English keyboard player (b. 1956)
1998 – Fritz Buchloh, German footballer and coach (b. 1909)
2000 – Eric Christmas, English-born Canadian actor (b. 1916)
  2000   – Carmen Martín Gaite, Spanish author, poet, and playwright (b. 1925)
  2000   – Raymond Lemieux, Canadian chemist and academic (b. 1920)
  2000   – Claude Sautet, French director and screenwriter (b. 1924)
2001 – Indro Montanelli, Italian journalist and historian (b. 1909)
2004 – Sacha Distel, French singer and guitarist (b. 1933)
  2004   – Illinois Jacquet, American saxophonist and composer (b. 1922)
2005 – Eugene Record, American singer-songwriter and producer (b. 1940)
2006 – Dika Newlin, American composer, singer-songwriter, and pianist (d. 1923)
  2006   – José Antonio Delgado, Venezuelan mountaineer (b. 1965)
2007 – Mike Coolbaugh, American baseball player and coach (b. 1972)
  2007   – Jarrod Cunningham, New Zealand rugby player (b. 1968)
  2007   – László Kovács, Hungarian-American director and cinematographer (b. 1933)
  2007   – Rollie Stiles, American baseball player (b. 1906)
2008 – Estelle Getty, American actress (b. 1923)
2009 – Richard M. Givan, American lawyer and judge (b. 1921)
  2009   – Peter Krieg, German director, producer, and screenwriter (b. 1947)
2010 – Kenny Guinn, American banker and politician, 27th Governor of Nevada (b. 1936)
2011 – Linda Christian, Mexican-American actress (b. 1923)
  2011   – Cees de Wolf, Dutch footballer (b. 1945)
2012 – Ding Guangen, Chinese engineer and politician (b. 1929)
  2012   – George Armitage Miller, American psychologist and academic (b. 1920)
  2012   – Frank Pierson, American director and screenwriter (b. 1925)
2013 – Natalie de Blois, American architect, co-designed the Lever House (b. 1921)
  2013   – Dennis Farina, American policeman and actor (b. 1944)
  2013   – Lawrie Reilly, Scottish footballer (b. 1928)
  2013   – Rosalie E. Wahl, American lawyer and judge (b. 1924)
2014 – Johann Breyer, German SS officer (b. 1925)
  2014   – Louis Lentin, Irish director and producer (b. 1933)
  2014   – Nitzan Shirazi, Israeli footballer and manager (b. 1971)
2018 – Frank Havens, American canoeist (b. 1924)
2022 – Maria Petri, English association football supporter (b. 1939)

Holidays and observances
Birthday of the Late King Sobhuza (Eswatini)
Christian feast day:
Abd-al-Masih
Joseph of Tiberias (or of Palestine)
Markella
Mary Magdalene
Nohra (Maronite Church)
July 22 (Eastern Orthodox liturgics)
Earliest day on which Parents' Day can fall, while 28 July is the latest; celebrated on the fourth Sunday in July. (United States)
National Press Day (Azerbaijan)
Pi Approximation Day, see also March 14
Ratcatcher's Day
Revolution Day (The Gambia)
Sarawak Independence Day (Sarawak, Malaysia)

References

External links

 
 
 

Days of the year
July